Correlli is an Australian television series first broadcast by ABC TV in 1995. It starred Deborra-Lee Furness as prison psychologist Louisa Correlli.

The series also featured her future husband Hugh Jackman in one of his earliest roles.  The first episode entitled "The Rat Tamer" has been released on to DVD. The creators and Associate Producers of the show were actress Denise Roberts from the ABC's G.P., and Carol Long.  Roberts also played the role of prison warden Helen Buckley in episodes four and five.

External links
 
Australian Television Archive: Correlli

Australian Broadcasting Corporation original programming
Australian drama television series
1995 Australian television series debuts
1995 Australian television series endings